Man Against Woman is a 1932 American pre-Code crime film directed by Irving Cummings and starring Jack Holt, Lillian Miles (in her first starring role) and Walter Connolly. The film was originally known as Plainclothes Man.

Synopsis
Tough New York cop Johnny McCloud falls in love with nightclub singer Lola Parker, but she seems more involved with gangster George Perry.

Cast
 Jack Holt as Johnny McCloud
 Lillian Miles as Lola Parker
 Walter Connolly as 	Mossie Ennis
 Gavin Gordon as George Perry
 Arthur Vinton as Happy O'Neill
 Jack La Rue as Alberti
 Clarence Muse as Smoke Johnson
 Emmett Corrigan as 	Christy
 Harry Seymour as Brodie
 Kathrin Clare Ward as Landlad

Critical reception
In his review of the film in The New York Times, film critic Mordaunt Hall wrote that the "exploits in this tale are scarcely credible, but the film affords some unconscious amusement." Regarding the actors, Hall wrote that "Holt is miscast in the part of the sleuth," "Connolly [...] gives an excellent performance, which at least atones for some of the shortcomings in the film," and that "Miles is acceptable as the torch singer."

References

Bibliography
 Langman, Larry & Finn, Daniel. A Guide to American Crime Films of the Thirties. Greenwood Press, 1995.

External links
 

1932 films
1932 crime films
1930s English-language films
American crime films
Columbia Pictures films
American black-and-white films
Films directed by Irving Cummings
Films set in New York City
Films with screenplays by Jo Swerling
1930s American films